Senator William T. Byrne House is a historic home located at Colonie in Albany County, New York.  It is a single-story residence with two single-story wings.  It features a single-story front portico supported by four square columns.  The roofs have wings along the top balustrades. The rear wall was built around 1880 and the front section in 1916. It is in the Colonial Revival architecture style. The property was purchased by Senator William T. Byrne in 1910.

It was listed on the National Register of Historic Places in 1985.

References

Houses on the National Register of Historic Places in New York (state)
Colonial Revival architecture in New York (state)
Houses completed in 1916
Houses in Albany County, New York
National Register of Historic Places in Albany County, New York